Bugsuk is an island barangay in the Balabac municipality of Palawan province in the Philippines.

History 

Eight crew members of the USS Flier reached Bugsuk Island after their submarine struck a mine on August 13, 1944, while on surface patrol during World War II. The survivors, who had been on deck and in the conning tower when the explosion occurred, swam 18 hours to reach an atoll near Bugsuk. Over the next three days, they swam to two other islands before landing on Bugsuk and being helped by Filipino guerrillas, led by Nazario B. Mayor.  Seventy-eight men died on the Flier, including seven who escaped the sub but didn't survive the swim.

References

External links
 Bugsuk Island at OpenStreetMap

Islands of Palawan
Barangays of Palawan